Anders Trulsson Bruland (1770–1818) was a Norwegian civil servant and politician.

He worked as a farmer at Kvamme farm and bailiff (lensmann) in Førde. He served as a deputy representative to the Norwegian Parliament during the term 1815–1816.

References
Anders Trulsson Bruland at NRK Sogn og Fjordane County Encyclopedia 

1770 births
1818 deaths
Deputy members of the Storting
Sogn og Fjordane politicians